Gull Feroza (born 28 December 1998) is a Pakistani cricketer who plays as a right-handed batter and wicket-keeper.

International career
In May 2022, she was named in Women's One Day International (WODI) and Women's Twenty20 International (WT20I) squads for Sri Lanka's tour of Pakistan. She made her WT20I debut on 24 May 2022, against Sri Lanka at Southend Club Cricket Stadium, Karachi.

Later the same month, she was named in Pakistan's team for the cricket tournament at the 2022 Commonwealth Games in Birmingham, England.

References

External links
 
 

1998 births
Living people
Place of birth missing (living people)
Pakistani women cricketers
Pakistan women Twenty20 International cricketers
Multan women cricketers
Higher Education Commission women cricketers
Cricketers at the 2022 Commonwealth Games
Commonwealth Games competitors for Pakistan